Syyed Hyder Husyn (born 9 October 1963) is a Bangladeshi singer-songwriter. Faisha gechi , 30 bochor poreo ami shadhinota take khujchi and Ami chitkar kore kadite chahiya korite parini chitkar are notable songs by him.

Career
Before starting his career as a singer, Haider was an aircraft engineer. His first album is Faisa Gechi, produced by Ektaar Music Ltd(officially launched on May 8, 2005) He has released a single, "Gonotontro". He wrote a few songs like "Mon Ki Je Chai" for the 90s band Winning.

Discography

Albums
 Faisha Gechi (2005), Ektaar Music Ltd
 Shopno
 Na Bola Kotha
 Prottasha (2011), Rage Records
 Khola Akash (2016), Aunik Studio

Album singles

 "Faisa Gechi"
 "Sharee"
 "Keno Kichu Bolle Na ?"
 "30 Bochor"
 "71 (Ekattor)"
 "Burigonga"
 "Dustu Chele"
 "Baby Baby"
 "Bhalo Lagena"
 "Amar Ponno Amar Desh"
 "Nobo Jagoron"
 "Bristy"
 "Podojugol"
 "Aids"
 "Antor"
 "Shobi Miche"
 "Shorkari Officer"
 "Procharona"
 "Mon Ki Je Chai"
 "Bolore Hai Hai"
 "Shobdortho"

Non-album singles
 Gonotontro
 Gush (2016)
 Manobota (2017)
 Janjot (2018)
 Alpo Boyosi Bou (2019)
 Jonmo Thake Jibon (2019)
 BDR Tragedy (2021; re-release)
 A Keamon Porihash (2022)
 Miki (2022)
 Swapna Jhokhon Chinnovinno (2022)
 Khuje Phiri Audhikar (2022)

References

External links 

 

Living people
21st-century Bangladeshi male singers
21st-century Bangladeshi singers
Bangladeshi lyricists
Bangladeshi guitarists
1963 births